Rajendra Place is a multi storeyed, multi-building commercial complex, located at the main Pusa Road, New Delhi, India. It is surrounded by the Central Delhi areas of Rajendra Nagar and Patel Nagar. The complex hosts several restaurants and offices, and is adjacent to the Jaypee Sidharth Hotel.

Transportation
Rajendra place is well connected to the Delhi Metro Rail System via the nearby Rajendra Place metro station on  the Blue Line.
Imly restaurant, famous for its train shaped form, is a nearby landmark.

Neighbourhoods in Delhi